The Canadian Elite Basketball League (CEBL) is a men's professional minor league basketball organization. The CEBL was founded in 2017 and began play in 2019 with six teams competing all owned and operated by ownership group Canadian Basketball Ventures.

The league currently consists of ten teams from six different provinces, with four being from Ontario, two from Alberta and one each from the provinces of British Columbia, Manitoba, Saskatchewan, and Quebec,  making the CEBL the largest professional sports league based entirely in Canada. CEBL teams play twenty regular-season games from May to August. The season culminates in the six-team playoffs which include a final four Championship Weekend where the league's champion is crowned.

History 

The CEBL was first announced in October 2017. Niagara River Lions owner Richard Petko had been dissatisfied with the operations of the National Basketball League of Canada, which he deemed to be a "shoestring business" with no vision. He attempted to persuade the league to hire Mike Morreale, a former Canadian Football League player who, Petko felt, could do better at marketing the league and attracting sponsorship. However, after the NBL declined, Petko and Morreale decided to organize their own league, with Morreale as CEO. The six charter teams were officially unveiled in May 2018, with the River Lions joining five newly-created franchises in Abbotsford which moved to Langley in 2021, Edmonton, Guelph, Hamilton, and Saskatoon.

Morreale stated that the CEBL would emphasize offering a "party wrapped around a basketball game" with "a ton of value for the fans" in order to attract spectators, including outdoor pre-game events, in-arena  entertainment, autograph sessions, and other features. The CEBL will, initially, operate as a single entity, with all teams owned by the league under individual general managers. However, the league may spin out its franchises to individual owners, or a single investor, in the future.

In December 2018, the CEBL reached a five-year deal with New Era to be the official apparel provider of the league. The CEBL also reached an official agreement with Canada Basketball for it to be recognized as its first division professional league (in a league system akin to European competition); this endorsement also allows the CEBL access to resources from the governing body. Canada Basketball CEO Glen Grunwald stated that the league would provide an "exciting new product and a further development opportunity for Canadian players, coaches, referees, administrators and management types." Due to this agreement, the league plays under the standard FIBA rules.

In January 2019, the CEBL announced a three-year agreement with Spalding to be the official ball of the league.

Due to the COVID-19 pandemic, the 2020 CEBL season was postponed, and conducted as a shortened tournament in a bio-secure bubble behind closed doors, branded as the CEBL Summer Series. Beginning in the 2020 season, the CEBL adopted the Elam Ending—as recently popularized by The Basketball Tournament and the NBA All-Star Game—for all games, under which the game clock is turned off near the end of the fourth quarter, and teams play to a target score to determine the winner.

In the 2021–22 season, the Edmonton Stingers represented Canada in the Basketball Champions League Americas (BCLA).

Expansion 
In November 2019, the Ottawa Blackjacks were announced as the league's first expansion team, and seventh overall, beginning in the 2020 season.

In February 2021, Morreale announced that an expansion team in Montreal would be added no earlier than the 2022 season; due to COVID-19, no new expansion teams were added for the 2021 season. Later in 2021, the Scarborough Shooting Stars, the Montreal Alliance, and the Newfoundland Growlers were all announced as expansion teams for the 2022 season.

Teams

Current teams

Former teams

Timeline

Champions

Organization

Executives 

 Mike Morreale, Chief Executive Officer and Commissioner
 John Lashway, Executive Vice-President, Strategy and Communications
 Josh Knoester, Vice-President, League Operations
 Joe Raso, Director, Basketball Operations
Source:

Players 
The CEBL's main focus will be on showcasing and developing Canadian talent in basketball: at least 70% of each team's roster must consist of Canadian players. As it will be played over the spring and summer months, the CEBL also sought to attract players wanting to continue developing their game over the traditional offseason period. Players were expected to be drawn from collegiate alumni (including U Sports and U.S. NCAA basketball), players with experience in other international leagues, as well as members of the Canadian national team.

The salary cap is $8,000 per team per game.

Broadcasting 
During the first season, games were primarily streamed on an in-house platform known as CEBL.tv; the league stated that it would provide the necessary means for each team to produce "a really good official and professional looking live stream that we can share without any kind of limitations to who can see it." The league considered the possibility of selling television rights to its championship to a traditional broadcaster.

On June 12, 2019, the CEBL announced that CBC Sports would stream all remaining games of the inaugural season on its digital platforms. It subsequently announced in November 2019 that CBC Sports had agreed to a three-year deal, which will also see eight games (seven regular-season games and the championship game) per-season aired on CBC Television.

For the 2020 season, the CEBL also began streaming games on Twitch. On August 7, the CEBL and Mediapro announced new rights deals in the Asia-Pacific and Oceania regions, such as Astro (Malaysia), Fox Sports Australia, SingTel, Sportscast (Taiwan), and TapGo (Philippines).

A feature length documentary about the 2020 "Summer Series", produced by Ward 1 Studios, was broadcast on May 29, 2021 on CBC national television and CBC Gem.

References

External links 

 
Basketball leagues in Canada
2017 establishments in Canada
Companies based in Ontario
Sports leagues established in 2017
Professional sports leagues in Canada